Robert or Bob Grim may refer to:

Bob Grim (baseball) (1930–1996), Major League Baseball player
Bob Grim (American football) (born 1945), American football player
Bobby Grim (1924–1995), American racecar driver

See also
Bob Grimm, guitarist with The Four Seasons
Robert Grimm (1881–1958), Swiss Socialist politician